Peru High School Historic District is a historic school complex and national historic district located at Peru, Miami County, Indiana.  It encompasses the Classical Revival style Central Grade School (c. 1922), Collegiate Gothic style Industrial Arts Building (c. 1926), and Art Deco style former high school (c. 1939).  The high school was built as a Works Progress Administration project along with the Tig-Arena and is a two-story masonry building.  The school yard is considered a contributing site.  The high school remained in use as a high school until the new Peru High School was built in 1969–1971.  Since 1990, the buildings have served as headquarters for the Miami Nation of Indiana.

It was listed on the National Register of Historic Places in 2013.

References

Works Progress Administration in Indiana
Historic districts on the National Register of Historic Places in Indiana
School buildings on the National Register of Historic Places in Indiana
School buildings completed in 1922
Neoclassical architecture in Indiana
Collegiate Gothic architecture in Indiana
Art Deco architecture in Indiana
Buildings and structures in Miami County, Indiana
National Register of Historic Places in Miami County, Indiana
1922 establishments in Indiana